Atlanta Rewound is an ongoing non-profit project to collect memories from the Atlanta, Georgia (U.S. state) media market and publish them online, both on an independent website, as well as though a Facebook page. The site was set up in May 2010 following the response from the Facebook page, in addition to the Birmingham Rewound and Huntsville Rewound sites. Lance George is the webmaster and site curator.

The site has many hits a month from around the world. The Birmingham Rewound website mentions the great pictures, video, and Facebook integration that this site has to offer.  The Georgia Radio Museum and Hall of Fame has also linked to this site as being an excellent database of Atlanta Metro TV/radio information.  Portions of the Atlanta Rewound website actually are derived from the "Lance George Personal Website" which started compilation in July 1996.

See also
Birmingham Rewound, covers the Birmingham metropolitan area
Huntsville Rewound, a spin-off site, covers the Huntsville metropolitan area

References

External links 
  Atlanta Rewound website

Culture of Atlanta
History websites of the United States